Jenna Michelle Boyd (born March 4, 1993) is an American actress. She began her career as a child actress with roles in the 2003 films The Hunted, Dickie Roberts: Former Child Star and The Missing, and the 2005 film The Sisterhood of the Traveling Pants. On television, she appeared on all four seasons of the Netflix comedy-drama Atypical (2017–2021).

Early life, education and family

Boyd was born in Bedford, Texas. She was discovered at age two in a modeling search. She and her parents and younger brother Cayden (also an actor) moved to Los Angeles to pursue her acting career. In September 2019, she moved to Tulsa, Oklahoma as part of the Tulsa Remote program.  

She is a graduate of Pepperdine University, where she earned a business degree.

Career
Boyd began her career at age three, appearing in episodes of the children's TV show Barney & Friends. She simultaneously acted and figure skated. In Dickie Roberts: Former Child Star she played the daughter of a family hired by the titular character (David Spade) to help him recapture his childhood. Boyd's big break came when she was cast in The Missing, alongside Cate Blanchett and Evan Rachel Wood. Although the film itself was not particularly well-received, critics paid Boyd's performance. 

In 2005 Boyd played leukemia-suffering Bailey Graffman in The Sisterhood of the Traveling Pants. She appeared in the Lifetime miniseries The Gathering as the daughter of a doctor (Peter Gallagher) searching for his wife; and in the Ghost Whisperer episode "Children of Ghosts", as a troubled teenager living in a foster home. In 2017, she had the recurring role of Paige Hardaway, girlfriend of the autistic main character Sam Gardner, in the Netflix series Atypical.

In 2017 she stated that she had become a consultant for the multi-level marketing company Rodan + Fields.

Filmography

Awards and nominations

References

External links

1993 births
Living people
Actresses from Dallas
American child actresses
American film actresses
American television actresses
Pepperdine University alumni
21st-century American actresses